Nandanam is a 2002 Indian Malayalam-language romantic film written, co-produced, and directed by Ranjith. Starring Navya Nair and Prithviraj Sukumaran with Kaviyoor Ponnamma, Revathi, Aravind Akash, Siddique and Sai Kumar in supporting roles. K. J. Yesudas and Sudheesh makes Cameo Appearance. The film won four Kerala State Film Awards  and two Filmfare Awards South. The film also marks the debut for Prithiviraj Sukumaran.

Plot
Balamani is an orphan who works as a maid to Unniyamma, the aging matriarch of the Ambalapaattil family, and stays with her in the large mansion. Though an ardent devotee of Lord Guruvayurappan (Lord Krishna), Balamani never gets to go to the sacred temple and offer her prayers to the deity. However, she likes the company and the love of Unniyamma who treats her like a granddaughter, and the affections of Kesavan Nair who is a distant relative of hers and had brought her to Ambalapaattil when she was young.

One day, Unniyamma's grandson Manu reaches Ambalapaatil to spend time with his grandmother. Balamani recognizes him from a dream she had where she marries him in front of Guruvayur temple. Although Manu regards her initially as just a help, he begins to have affection towards Balamani which she reciprocates.

Cast

Prithviraj Sukumaran as Manu Nandakumar 
Navya Nair as Balamani
Aravind Akash as Unnikrishnan (voiced by Sudheesh)
Kaviyoor Ponnamma as Ambalapatil Unni Amma, Manu's maternal grandmother
Revathi as Thankam Nandakumar, Unni Amma's daughter and Manu's mother
Siddique as Balachandran, Unni Amma's family friend
Innocent as Kesavan Nair
Jagathy Sreekumar as Kumbidi Swamy / Palarivattom Sasi
Kalaranjini as Janaki, Unnikrishnan's Mother and Thankam's friend (voiced by Urvashi)
Sai Kumar as Ramadasan, Unni Amma's second son and Thankam's elder brother
Vijayakumari as Parootty Amma
Subbalakshmi as Veshamani Ammal
Meena Ganesh as Karthyayani Amma
N. F. Varghese as Sreedharan, Unni Amma's nephew
Jagannatha Varma as Ambalapatil Madhava Menon, Unniyamma's Relative
Kozhikode Narayanan Nair as Shankarammavan, Unniyamma's Relative
Sadiq as Vijayan, Unniyamma's Nephew
Mala Aravindan as Sankaran Mushari
Kalabhavan Mani as Mahadevan, son of Sankaran Moosari
Jagadeesh as Elder son of Sankaran Moosari
Augustine as Kunjiraman, the cook
V. K. Sreeraman as Vishwanatha Menon, Unni Amma's eldest son and Nandhini's father
Zeenath as Unni Amma's niece
Subair as Venu Menon
 Jolly Easo as Sumam Venu, Thankam's friend 
Jyothirmayi as daughter of Venu Menon and Manu's fiancee (cameo)
 Bindu Ramakrishnan as Unni Amma's relative
Ambika Mohan as Unni Amma's relative
 Nivia Rebin  as Unni Amma's relative
Gayathri as Sakundala, Janaki's maid
Sudheesh as the real Unnikrishnan (cameo)
K. J. Yesudas as himself (cameo)
Sukumaran as Nandakumar, Manu's father (photo appearance)

Trivia
This movie was shot in Paliyam Kovilakam in Paravoor.

Dubbing
|Dubbed for - Aravind Akash
|Character - Unnikrishnan
|Dubbed Actor - Sudheesh

|Dubbed for - Kalaranjini
|Character - Janaki
|Dubbed Actor - Urvashi)

|Dubbed for - Revathy
|Character - Thankam
|Dubbing Artist - Bhagyalakshmi

Music

The most critically acclaimed and popular songs of this film were written by Gireesh Puthenchery and composed by Madhavan Raveendran.
The songs were chart for weeks and the song Karmukil Varnante become highly popular and Girish Puthenchery and Raveendran won Kerala State Film Award for Best Lyricist and Best Music Director respectively and also K.S. Chithra won Kerala State Film Award for Best Female Playback Singer of the year 2004.

Reception

Box office
The film was a commercial success at the box office.

Accolades
Filmfare Awards South
Filmfare Award for Best Film - Malayalam – Ranjith & Siddique
Filmfare Award for Best Actress - Malayalam – Navya Nair

Kerala State Film Awards
Kerala State Film Award for Best Actress – Navya Nair
Best Female Playback Singer – K.S.Chitra
Best Music Director –Raveendran
Kerala State Film Award for Best Lyrics – Gireesh Puthenchery

Asianet Film Awards
Asianet Award for Best Film – Ranjith
Asianet Award for Best Actress – Navya Nair

Remakes
Ranjith worked on a Tamil remake of the film which was shelved after some pre-production complications, and the movie was remade as Seedan by director Subramaniya Siva. It was also remade in Telugu as Maa Baapu Bommaki Pellanta by Raviraja Pinisetty and in Kannada as Gokula Krishna.

References

External links

2000s Malayalam-language films
2002 romantic drama films
2002 films
Films scored by Raveendran
Malayalam films remade in other languages
Films directed by Ranjith
Indian romantic drama films
Indian family films
Films shot in Thrissur